José David Vizcarra Morales (born 21 December 1990 in Mexico City) is a Mexican professional footballer who plays for Puebla F.C. Premier.

External links
 
 

Living people
1990 births
Mexican footballers
Mexican beach soccer players
Association football midfielders
Atlético San Luis footballers
Ascenso MX players
Footballers from Mexico City
21st-century Mexican people